Talal Khalfan Hadid Al-Farsi (born 25 November 1980), commonly known as Talal Khalfan, is an Omani footballer who last played for Al-Nahda Club.

Club career statistics

International career
Talal was part of the first team squad of the Oman national football team till 2010. He was selected for the national team for the first time in 1996. He has made five appearances in the 2010 FIFA World Cup qualification.

National team career statistics

Goals for Senior National Team

Honours

Club
With Al-Oruba
Omani League (2): 2001–02, 2008–09; Runner-up 2010–11
Sultan Qaboos Cup (2): 2001, 2010
Omani Super Cup (2): 2002, 2011

With Al-Arabi
Kuwait Emir Cup (3): 2005, 2006, 2008
Kuwait Crown Prince Cup (1): 2007
Kuwait Super Cup (1): 2008

With Al-Ittihad
Libyan Premier League (2): 2007–08, 2008–09
Libyan Super Cup (1): 2008 Libyan Super Cup

With Al-Nahda
Sultan Qaboos Cup (0): Runner-up 2012

References

External links
 
 
 
 

1980 births
Living people
Omani footballers
Oman international footballers
Omani expatriate footballers
Association football midfielders
Bowsher Club players
Al-Orouba SC players
Al-Arabi SC (Kuwait) players
Muscat Club players
Al-Ittihad Club (Tripoli) players
Najran SC players
Al-Nahda Club (Oman) players
Saudi Professional League players
Expatriate footballers in Kuwait
Omani expatriate sportspeople in Kuwait
Expatriate footballers in Libya
Omani expatriate sportspeople in Libya
Expatriate footballers in Saudi Arabia
Omani expatriate sportspeople in Saudi Arabia
People from Sur, Oman
Footballers at the 1998 Asian Games
Asian Games competitors for Oman
Kuwait Premier League players
Libyan Premier League players